Cottleville is a city in St. Charles County, Missouri, United States. The population was 3,075 at the 2010 census.

History
A post office called Cottleville has been in operation since 1843. The town site was laid out in 1839. It was named by Captain Lorenzo Cottle, an early settler and a veteran of the Black Hawk War and Seminole Wars.

Schools
Cottleville is home to Francis Howell Central High School, Louis C. Saeger Middle School and Warren Elementary School. St. Joseph Catholic School is also located in Cottleville, providing classes for grades K-8; St. Joseph Catholic Church is the largest church by number of parishioners in the Roman Catholic Archdiocese of St. Louis. St. Charles Community College is also located nearby.

Geography
Cottleville is located at  (38.751819, -90.653390).

Demographics

2010 census
As of the census of 2010, there were 3,075 people, 1,020 households, and 847 families living in the city. The racial makeup of the city was 92.7% White, 3.7% African American, 0.2% Native American, 1.5% Asian, 0.5% from other races, and 1.4% from two or more races. Hispanic or Latino of any race were 1.8% of the population.

There were 1,020 households, of which 45.5% had children under the age of 18 living with them, 71.3% were married couples living together, 8.0% had a female householder with no husband present, 3.7% had a male householder with no wife present, and 17.0% were non-families. 13.3% of all households were made up of individuals, and 3.6% had someone living alone who was 65 years of age or older. The average household size was 3.01 and the average family size was 3.31.

The median age in the city was 38.2 years. 29.4% of residents were under the age of 18; 7.3% were between the ages of 18 and 24; 25.1% were from 25 to 44; 30.3% were from 45 to 64; and 7.8% were 65 years of age or older. The gender makeup of the city was 50.0% male and 50.0% female.

2000 census
As of the census of 2000, there were 1,928 people, 600 households, and 526 families living in the city. The racial makeup of the city was 96.27% White, 1.97% African American, 0.57% Asian, 0.26% from other races, and 0.93% from two or more races. Hispanic or Latino of any race were 0.88% of the population.

There were 600 households, out of which 56.0% had children under the age of 18 living with them, 79.3% were married couples living together, 5.7% had a female householder with no husband present, and 12.2% were non-families. 8.2% of all households were made up of individuals, and 2.2% had someone living alone who was 65 years of age or older. The average household size was 3.20 and the average family size was 3.41.

In the city the age distribution of the population shows 35.2% under the age of 18, 5.4% from 18 to 24, 38.8% from 25 to 44, 17.1% from 45 to 64, and 3.5% who were 65 years of age or older. The median age was 31 years. For every 100 females there were 99.2 males. For every 100 females age 18 and over, there were 99.4 males.

The median income for a household in the city was $74,200, and the median income for a family was $78,017. Males had a median income of $48,714 versus $35,000 for females. The per capita income for the city was $26,729. About 1.5% of families and 1.7% of the population were below the poverty line, including 3.0% of those under age 18 and none of those age 65 or over.

References

External links
 City of Cottleville

Cities in St. Charles County, Missouri
Cities in Missouri